Kotuszów  is a village in the administrative district of Gmina Szydłów, within Staszów County, Świętokrzyskie Voivodeship, in south-central Poland.

The village has a population of  272.

Demography 
According to the 2002 Poland census, there were 290 people residing in Kotuszów village, of whom 52.1% were male and 47.9% were female. In the village, the population was spread out, with 21.7% under the age of 18, 30.7% from 18 to 44, 24.5% from 45 to 64, and 23.1% who were 65 years of age or older.
 Figure 1. Population pyramid of village in 2002 — by age group and sex

References

See also
 Lesser Polish Way

Villages in Staszów County